Fakılı   is a village in Erdemli district of Mersin Province, Turkey. At  it is  situated in the forests of Toros Mountains. It is at the east side of Alata River valley and opposite to Koramşalı at the west of the valley. The population of Fakılı was 212 . as of 2012. The village is named after Fakih, its founder in 1520s . The main economic activity is farming. Tomato, cucumber, pomegranate, beans and grapes are the main crops.

References

Villages in Erdemli District